Gerald Wayne Dillon (born May 25, 1955) is a Canadian former professional ice hockey player. He played in the World Hockey Association with the Toronto Toros and Birmingham Bulls, and in the National Hockey League with the New York Rangers and Winnipeg Jets between 1973 and 1980.

Playing career
As a youth, Dillon played in the 1967 Quebec International Pee-Wee Hockey Tournament with the Scarboro Lions minor ice hockey team.

Dillon spent four years in the National Hockey League (NHL) and was known as a top scorer in the World Hockey Association (WHA) and junior leagues. He was chosen 12th overall by the New York Rangers in the 1975 NHL Amateur Draft after he had already played two seasons in the WHA for the Toronto Toros, recording 95 points in 1974-75. He had been one of the first underage players to sign with a WHA team prior to becoming eligible for the NHL Amateur Draft. With the Rangers, he recorded 44 points in his rookie season in 1975-76. Dillon was forced into earlier retirement due to hindered performance as a result from injuries. 

His brother, Gary Dillon, played briefly in the NHL as a centre for the Colorado Rockies. Following 229 NHL games Dillon recorded a total of 43 goals and 66 assists for 109 points.

Career statistics

References

External links

1955 births
Living people
Birmingham Bulls players
Canadian ice hockey centres
Fredericton Express players
National Hockey League first-round draft picks
New Haven Nighthawks players
New York Rangers draft picks
New York Rangers players
SC Rapperswil-Jona Lakers players
Ice hockey people from Toronto
Toronto Marlboros players
Toronto Toros players
Winnipeg Jets (1979–1996) players